Brian is an unincorporated community in Dunklin County, in the U.S. state of Missouri.

History
A post office called Brian was established in 1910, and remained in operation until 1926. The community has the name of the local Brian family.

References

Unincorporated communities in Dunklin County, Missouri
Unincorporated communities in Missouri